The National Theatre of Opera and Ballet of Albania (Albanian: Teatri Kombëtar i Operas dhe Baletit - TKOB) is a theatre in Tirana, Albania. It is the largest theatre in the country, and hosts music and dance performances year round.

History

The National Opera and Ballet Theatre was founded on 29 November 1953. It first operated within the building of the University of Arts of Albania and subsequently transferred into the Palace of Culture of Tirana building in central Tirana. The theatre helped develop the capital's arts scene, since formerly there had been no venue for performances. Since the theatre's inception, groups and orchestras from various countries in the communist bloc came to give performances.

The national Song and Dance Ensemble often performs at the national theatre.

The Theatre reports to the Ministry of Culture, Youth, and Sports and is financed out of the state budget. Today, the Opera presents works by Albanian and international composers. Tickets can be purchased on-site. It employs 196 persons.

In 2016, the Prime Minister of Albania announced that the Theatre will be reconstructed.

See also
List of concert halls
Academy of Music and Arts of Albania
Palace of Culture of Tirana
National Gallery of Figurative Arts of Albania

References

External links
Official website

Theatres in Albania
Opera houses in Albania
Tourist attractions in Tirana
Buildings and structures in Tirana
Performing groups established in 1953
1953 establishments in Albania